Birgitta Helena Grundberg, later surname: Chiliy (born 26 June 1972) is a Swedish former competitive figure skater. She is the 1995 and 1997 Swedish national champion and competed at the 1998 Winter Olympics in Nagano. She reached the free skate at the 1997 World Championships in Lausanne and 1998 European Championships in Milan.

After retiring from competition, Grundberg performed in ice shows and became the head coach at Viggbyholm IK Konståkning.

Programs

Competitive highlights

References 

1972 births
Swedish female single skaters
Living people
Figure skaters at the 1998 Winter Olympics
Olympic figure skaters of Sweden
People from Örnsköldsvik Municipality
Sportspeople from Västernorrland County
20th-century Swedish women